The president of the Senate of the Northern Mariana Islands is the presiding officer of the upper chamber of that legislature, in the Commonwealth of the Northern Mariana Islands (CNMI).

Sources
Information through 2012 provided by Simion Lisua, Clerk of the Northern Mariana Legislature 

Senate, Presidents
Northern Mariana Islands, Senate